Ritchies is the largest independent supermarket chain in Australia, owned by a group of private investors including Metcash. It is also known as "Ritchies Supa IGA". The majority of its stores are located throughout Victoria. Ritchies annual revenue is estimated to be approx. $1.4b annually. 

In recent years, Ritchies' growth has been substantial.  With less than 20 stores in 2000, Ritchies now appears on the top 20 Australian retailers list with the likes of Australian retailing giants Kmart, Myer and Wesfarmers Bunnings to name a few.

History
Ritchies Stores were founded in 1870 by Thomas Ritchie after surviving the shipwrecked Isabella Watson, the first store opening up in Frankston, Victoria on what is now Nepean Highway.

Loyalty schemes

Community Benefit/Ritchies Card

Ritchies CEO Fred Harrison recognised the importance of introducing a loyalty program. The majority of loyalty programs at the time focused on rewarding the customer with gifts. Ritchies decided to go in the opposite direction, asking customers to nominate a club, school or charity. Ritchies would then donate a percentage of the total spend to the customer's nominated organisation each time the customer shopped within their stores.  As of February 2020, Ritchies have donated over $52,000,000 under the program.

Fuel Offer

Following the lead from UK giants Tesco and Sainsbury's, Australian supermarket chains introduced a discount on fuel when customers purchased in excess of a set dollar amount in their stores.  Ritchies currently offer a 4 cent/L discount at participating BP or United service stations when transactions of over $25 are conducted in-store.

Christmas Club
The Christmas club, is a savings program where customers can make regular deposits into their Christmas Club account. It was designed to help customers who find saving for the festive season difficult.  Customers can either make deposits at the checkout or set up direct debits from their bank account. On the 1st of December, Christmas Club members receive a statement showing how much they have saved and a letter asking them to pick up their gift card.  Gift cards are valid in any Ritchies Store. Customers that save over $200 for the year also receive a free gift. The program has been running since 2000.

See also

 List of oldest companies in Australia

References

External links

Supermarkets of Australia
Retail companies established in 1870
Australian companies established in 1870
Companies based in Melbourne